The Metropolitan Club of New York is a private social club on the Upper East Side of Manhattan in New York City. It was founded as a gentlemen's club in 1891 for men only, but it was one of the first major clubs in New York to admit women, though they still represent a minority.

History
The Metropolitan Club was formed in 1891 by J. P. Morgan, who served as its first president. It was actually the second organization with that name in its neighborhood. The New York Times reported on March 10, 1891, about the name selected two days previous: 

There is already a Metropolitan Club, which for some years has occupied quarters in the neighborhood in which the millionaires think of building.

Other original members of the club included William Kissam Vanderbilt and James A. Roosevelt. "Each member, which included Vanderbilts and Whitneys, contributed $5,000 to buy the plot of land."

Clubhouse
The architects of the original building (erected in 1893) were McKim, Mead & White. The east wing, erected in 1912, was designed by Ogden Codman Jr. Its 1894 clubhouse, designed by Stanford White, stands at 1 East 60th Street, on the northeast corner of Fifth Avenue. Cornelius Vanderbilt II signed the purchase agreement on behalf of the club.

The address for parking is 11 East 61st Street.

House rules

The Metropolitan Club maintains a dress code as part of its house rules:

 Men must wear jackets and ties – "turtlenecks and ascots are not acceptable."
 Ladies should wear "dresses, skirts, dressy pant suits, or business pant suits."
"Jeans, shorts, stirrup pants, leggings, stretch pants, tight pants, sweats and T-shirts are absolutely not acceptable."

Cell phones and laptops are prohibited in the Club except in private meeting rooms and bedrooms.

Activities
The club has had an ongoing involvement in the social life of the upper class, including fundraising, black tie balls, and sports.

Notable members

Founding members

 J. P. Morgan (1837–1913), financier, banker, philanthropist, art collector, and the club's founder and first president
 John Lambert Cadwalader (1836–1914), lawyer
 Robert Goelet (1841–1899), real estate developer
 George G. Haven, Jr. (1866–1925), businessman
 James A. Roosevelt (1825–1898), merchant
 Cornelius Vanderbilt II (1843–1899), industrialist, philanthropist
 William Kissam Vanderbilt (1849–1920), horse breeder
 Monte Waterbury (1876–1920), businessman, polo player
 William Collins Whitney (1841–1904), United States Secretary of the Navy, financier

Other notable members

 Charles Pierrepont Henry Gilbert (1861–1952), architect
 Charles H. Tenney (1842–1919), merchant and banker
 Edward Eugene Loomis (1864–1937), railroad executive
 Frederick Townsend Martin (1849–1914), writer and advocate for the poor
 George Goelet Kip (1845-1926), lawyer
 James L. Holloway III (1922–2019), United States Navy admiral and naval aviator
 James T. Woodward (1837–1910), banker
 Jerauld Wright (1898–1995), United States Navy admiral
 Larry Pressler (born 1942), Republican politician and the first Vietnam veteran to be elected to the United States Senate
 Levi Parsons Morton (1824–1920), minister to France, Republican vice president under Benjamin Harrison, governor of New York and second president of The Metropolitan Club
 Pippa Malmgren (born 1962), politics and policy expert
 Ray Price (1930–2019), chief speechwriter of President Richard Nixon
 Robert Maclay (1834–1898), merchant, business executive, and civic activist
 Robert Winthrop (1833–1892), banker
 Spruille Braden (1894–1978), diplomat, businessman, member of the Council on Foreign Relations, and past president
 Walter Eli Clark (1869–1950), journalist and newspaper publisher
 Walter J. Cummings, Jr. (1916–1999), United States Solicitor General and federal judge
 William Astor Chanler (1867–1934), soldier, explorer, and United States Representative
 William Dawes Miller ( 1918–1993), engineer and past president
 William L. Harkness (1858–1919), Standard Oil heir and philanthropist
 Woodbury Kane (1859–1905), yachtsman and member of Theodore Roosevelt's Rough Riders

See also
 List of New York City Designated Landmarks in Manhattan from 59th to 110th Streets
 List of traditional gentlemen's clubs in the United States

References

Notes

Citations

Bibliography

External links 

 

1891 establishments in New York (state)
Clubs and societies in New York City
Clubs and societies in the United States
Fifth Avenue
Gentlemen's clubs in New York City
McKim, Mead & White buildings
New York City Designated Landmarks in Manhattan
Organizations established in 1891
Upper East Side